Baronets are a rank in the British aristocracy. The current Baronetage of the United Kingdom has replaced the earlier but existing Baronetages of England, Nova Scotia, Ireland, and Great Britain.

Baronetage of England (1611–1705)

King James I created the hereditary Order of Baronets in England on 22 May 1611, for the settlement of Ireland. He offered the dignity to 200 gentlemen of good birth, with a clear estate of £1,000 a year, on condition that each one should pay a sum equivalent to three years' pay to 30 soldiers at 8d per day per man (total – £1,095) into the King's Exchequer.

The Baronetage of England comprises all baronetcies created in the Kingdom of England before the Act of Union in 1707. In that year, the Baronetage of England and the Baronetage of Nova Scotia were replaced by the Baronetage of Great Britain.

The extant baronetcies are listed below in order of precedence (i.e. date). All other baronetcies, including extinct, dormant (D), unproven (U), under review (R) or forfeit, are on a separate list of baronetcies.

The baronetcy lists include any peerage titles which are held by the baronet.

To be recognised as a baronet, it is necessary to prove a claim of succession. When this has been done, the name is entered on The Official Roll. This was ordained by Royal Warrant in February 1910. Those who have not so proven are shown below as unproven or under review or dormant. A baronetcy is considered dormant if, five years after the death of the previous incumbent, no heir has come forward to claim it.

Baronets in the Baronetage of England

.* as of 17 July 2016 (heirs are known to exist)

Baronetage of Nova Scotia (1625–1706)

The Baronetage of Nova Scotia was devised in 1624 as a means of settling the plantation of that province (now a province of Canada). King James VI announced his intention of creating 100 baronets, each of whom was to support six colonists for two years (or pay 2,000 merks in lieu thereof) and also to pay 1,000 merks to Sir William Alexander, to whom the province had been granted by charter in 1621.

James died before this scheme could be implemented, but it was carried out by his son Charles I, who created the first Scottish baronet on 28 May 1625, covenanting in the creation charter that the baronets of Scotland or of Nova Scotia should never exceed 150, that their heirs apparent should be knighted on coming of age (21), and that no one should receive the honour who had not fulfilled the conditions, viz, paid 3,000 merks (£166, 13s. 4d.) towards the plantation of the colony. Four years later (17 November 1629) the king wrote to the contractors for baronets, recognising that they had advanced large sums to Sir William Alexander for the plantation on the security of the payments to be made by future baronets, and empowering them to offer a further inducement to applicants; and on the same day he granted to all Nova Scotia baronets the right to wear about their necks, suspended by an orange tawny ribbon, a badge bearing an azure saltire with a crowned inescutcheon of the arms of Scotland and the motto Fax mentis honestae gloria (Glory is the torch that leads on the honourable mind). As the required number, however, could not be completed, Charles announced in 1633 that English and Irish gentlemen might receive the honour, and in 1634 they began to do so. Yet even so, he was only able to create a few more than 120 in all. In 1638 the creation ceased to carry with it the grant of lands in Nova Scotia, and on the union with England (1707) the Scottish creations ceased, English and Scotsmen alike receiving thenceforth Baronetcies of Great Britain.

To be recognised as a baronet, it is necessary to prove a claim of succession. When this has been done, the name is entered on the Official Roll. This was ordained by royal warrant in 1910. Many baronets also hold peerage titles; these have been listed below. The baronetcies below are listed in order of precedence (i.e. date order). For a complete list of all baronetcies, see List of Baronetcies.

Baronets in the Baronetage of Nova Scotia

.* as of 25 July 2016 (heirs are known to exist)

Baronetage of Ireland (1619–1800)
This is a list of extant, dormant, unproven and under review baronetcies in the Baronetage of Ireland. They were first created in 1619, and were replaced by the Baronetage of the United Kingdom in 1800.

To be recognised as a Baronet, it is necessary to prove a claim of succession. When this has been done, the name is entered on The Official Roll. This was ordained by Royal Warrant in 1910. Those who have not so proven are shown below as unproven or under review or dormant.
The baronetcies are listed in order of precedence (i.e. date order).

Baronets in the Baronetage of Ireland

Baronetage of Great Britain (1707–1800) 

The below is a list of all extant, dormant, unrecognized, and under review baronetcies in the Baronetage of Great Britain, which replaced the Baronetages of Nova Scotia and of England in 1707. In 1801 it was succeeded by the Baronetage of the United Kingdom.

To be recognized as a Baronet, it is necessary to prove a claim of succession to one previously recognized. Once this has been done, the new Baronet's name is entered on the Official Roll, a procedure laid down by Royal Warrant in 1910. Those who have not proved their claim are shown below as unproven, under review, or dormant.

These baronetcies are listed in order of precedence, which is established by the date of the creation. For a complete list of baronetcies see List of baronetcies.

Baronets in the Baronetage of Great Britain

Baronetage of the United Kingdom (1801–present)

The Baronetage of the United Kingdom started with the formation of the United Kingdom of Great Britain and Ireland in 1801, replacing the Baronetage of Great Britain. (For a complete list of baronetcies see List of Baronetcies  – which includes extinct baronetcies.)

As ordained by the Royal Warrant in 1910, it is necessary to prove a claim of succession to be recognised as a Baronet and have a name entered on The Official Roll. Those who have not so proven are shown below as unproven, under review or dormant.

The baronetcies are listed below in order of precedence (date order). (For ease in editing, we have created a fresh table every 25 years.)

The last baronet to be created was Sir Denis Thatcher in 1990.

1801

1825

1850

1875

1900

1925

1950

1975

See also
List of baronetcies
List of baronetcies in the Baronetage of the United Kingdom

Notes

References

External links
Official Roll of the Baronetage
Succession to a baronetcy